Lukáš Matejka (born February 21, 1990) is a Slovak professional ice hockey defenceman who is currently playing with MHC Martin of the Slovak Extraliga.

References

External links

Living people
MHC Martin players
1990 births
Sportspeople from Martin, Slovakia
Slovak ice hockey defencemen
Expatriate ice hockey players in Kazakhstan
Slovak expatriate sportspeople in Kazakhstan
Slovak expatriate ice hockey people